The Roman Catholic Archdiocese of Toamasina is one of five Latin Metropolitan archdioceses on Madagascar, yet depends on the missionary Roman Congregation for the Evangelization of Peoples.
 
Its cathedral archiepiscopal see is the Cathédrale Saint Joseph, dedicated to Saint Joseph in the city of Toamasina. It was elevated to the rank of Metropolitan Archdiocese by Pope Benedict XVI on Friday, February 26, 2010.

Statistics 
As per 2014, it pastorally served 620,022 Catholics (31.1% of 1,992,866 total) on 23,690 km2 in 21 parishes with 59 priests (22 diocesan, 37 religious), 185 lay religious (82 brothers, 103 sisters) and 19 seminarians.

Ecclesiastical Province 
Toamasina has as suffragan sees: 
 Roman Catholic Diocese of Ambatondrazaka
 Roman Catholic Diocese of Fenoarivo Atsinanana
 Roman Catholic Diocese of Moramanga.

History 
 Established on June 18, 1935 as Apostolic Prefecture of Vatomandry, on territories split off from the then Apostolic Vicariate of Fianarantsoa and Apostolic Vicariate of Tananarive 
 Promoted on May 25, 1939 and renamed after its new see as Apostolic Vicariate of Tamatave. 
 Promoted on September 14, 1955 as Diocese of Tamatave 
 On 1968.04.09 it lost territory to establish the Diocese of Mananjary
 Renamed on January 31, 1990 like its see as Diocese of Toamasina
 Promoted on February 26, 2010 as Metropolitan Archdiocese of Toamasina

Ordinaries 
(all Roman rite)

Apostolic Prefect of Vatomandry
 Father Alain-Sébastien Le Breton, Montfort Missionaries (S.M.M.) (born France) (1935 – 1939.05.25 see below)

Apostolic Vicar of Tamatave
 Alain-Sébastien Le Breton, S.M.M. (see above 1939.05.25 – 1955.09.14 see below), Titular Bishop of Hypselis (1939.05.25 – 1955.09.14)

Suffragan Bishops of Tamatave  
 Alain-Sébastien Le Breton, S.M.M. (see above 1955.09.14 – retired 1957.03.15); emeritate as Titular Bishop of Salona (1957.03.15 – death 1964.12.16)
 Jules-Joseph Puset, Sulpicians (P.S.S.) (born France) (1957.11.14 – retired 1972.03.25), died 1983
 Jérôme Razafindrazaka (1972.03.25 – retired 1989.05.15), died 1992
 René Joseph Rakotondrabé (1989.05.15 – 1990.01.31 see below); previously Titular Bishop of Umbriatico (1972.03.25 – 1974.02.28) as Auxiliary Bishop of Tuléar (Madagascar) (1972.03.25 – 1974.02.28), succeeding as Bishop of Tuléar (1974.02.28 – 1989.05.15)

Suffragan Bishops of Toamasina
 René Joseph Rakotondrabé (see above 1989.05.15 - retired 2008.11.24), died 2012
 Desire Tsarahazana (2008.11.24 - 2010.02.26 see below); previously Bishop of Fenoarivo Atsinanana (Madagascar) (2000.10.30 – 2008.11.24), remaining a while Apostolic Administrator of Fenoarivo Atsinanana (2008.12 – 2009.02.10); future Cardinal

Metropolitan Archbishops of Toamasina 
 Desire Tsarahazana (see above 2010.02.26 - ...), also President of Episcopal Conference of Madagascar (2012.11 – ...); Cardinal in 2018

See also 
 List of Roman Catholic dioceses in Madagascar
 Roman Catholicism in Madagascar

Sources and external links 
 GCatholic.org
 Catholic Hierarchy

Roman Catholic dioceses in Madagascar
Christian organizations established in 1935
Roman Catholic dioceses and prelatures established in the 20th century
1935 establishments in Madagascar